The Ferrari 212 F1 was a Formula 1 and Formula 2 racing car designed by Aurelio Lampredi for Scuderia Ferrari in .

Racing history
Two 212 F1 chassis were built. One with a De Dion rear axle (chassis 102) and one car with a swing axle (chassis 110). The car was powered by a 2562 cc V12 engine.

The Ferrari 212 F1 (chassis 102) made its debut at the 1951 Syracuse Grand Prix where it was driven by Dorino Serafini. Serafini finished second behind Ferrari teammate Luigi Villoresi. Two weeks later Serafini was back behind the wheel of the car at Pau. He qualified the car in third place but retired from the race after 49 laps due to steering problems. These are the only two races in which chassis 102 was entered.

Ferrari sold chassis 110 to Swiss driver Rudi Fischer, the leader of Ecurie Espadon. Fischer debuted the car at the non-championship Syracuse Grand Prix. He finished third behind Serafini in the other 212 F1. Fischer finished third at the San Remo Grand Prix and second at the Bordeaux Grand Prix. Fischer made his and the cars' World Championship debut at the 1951 Swiss Grand Prix. After starting tenth he finished the race in eleventh position. Fischer finished sixth at the German Grand Prix, just one position shy of World Championship points. The car was also entered at the Italian Grand Prix but Fischer did not start the race after a crash in practice. Fischer also entered the car in Formula Two races using a Ferrari 166 1995cc V12 engine. He won the Formula Two races at Aix-les-Bains and Angoulême in 1951.

After 1951 the car only appeared as a Formula 2 car as the Formula One World Championship adopted Formula Two regulations for the 1952 and 1953 seasons. For the 1952 season Rudi Fischer bought a Ferrari 500 which he used at all the races he entered. The 212 F1 was now used as a secondary entry. Peter Hirt drove the car at the Swiss Grand Prix. Fischer shared the 212 F1 with Hirt at the French Grand Prix. Fischer was initially due to drive his Ferrari 500, but engine problems in practice meant that he instead participated in the 212 F1. Hirt made his last appearance in the car at the British Grand Prix, where he retired from the race. Rudolf Schoeller drove the car at the Nürburgring but also retired from the race. Hans Stuck was entered at the Italian Grand Prix but he failed to qualify for the race as only 24 cars were allowed to start the race.

The 212 F1 made its final appearance at the 1953 Swiss Grand Prix. Max de Terra drove the car and finished the race in eighth position, 14 laps behind race winner Alberto Ascari.

Complete Formula One World Championship results
(key)

References

External links
 Ferrari 212 F1: Ferrari History

212 F1